Andrea Quinn (born 1964) is an English conductor.

Early life 
She studied at the Royal Academy of Music and in Hungary. In 1993 Quinn won the Royal Opera House’s Conduct for Dance competition, and has since then been in great demand as a ballet conductor.

Career 
She was music director of the Royal Ballet from 1998 to 2001 and became music director of New York City Ballet in 2001. She has also conducted the English National Opera.

In 2000 Quinn received a nomination for Female Artist of the Year at the Classical Brit Awards

Andrea Quinn has conducted major orchestras including the London Symphony Orchestra, the Philharmonia Orchestra, the London Philharmonic Orchestra, the Royal Philharmonic Orchestra, the BBC National Orchestra of Wales, the BBC Scottish Symphony Orchestra, the Hallé Orchestra and the Scottish Chamber Orchestra.

She has worked in Australia with the Adelaide and the Melbourne Symphony Orchestra, the Hong Kong Philharmonic Orchestra, the Gothenburg Symphony Orchestra, the NRK Radio Orchestra in Oslo, the Norrköping Symphony Orchestra and orchestras in Italy, Finland, Singapore, Kuala Lumpur, Paris and Toledo, Ohio.

Earlier in her career she conducted the London Philharmonic Youth Orchestra, and Fulham Symphony Orchestra.

Selected recordings 

 Camille Saint-Saëns, Piano concertos n°2 and n°5, Brigitte Engerer, piano - Ensemble orchestral de Paris, conducted by Andrea Quin. CD Mirare 2008
 Thierry Pécou, L'Oiseau innumérable,  Ensemble orchestral de Paris, piano: Alexandre Tharaud, Harmonia Mundi n° HMC 801974, 2008
 Paul McCartney, Tuesday, London Symphony Orchestra, EMI Records

References 

English conductors (music)
1964 births
Women conductors (music)
Living people
21st-century British conductors (music)